Frazier Chorus were an English pop group from Brighton, England. They were known for their unconventional instrumentation, including synthesizers, trumpets, flutes and clarinets, as well as frontman Tim Freeman's "soft, heavily accented ... talk-singing" and sarcastically witty lyrics.

History
Frazier Chorus was formed in Brighton, England, by Tim Freeman (the brother of actor Martin Freeman, on vocals and keyboards), Michéle Allardyce (percussion), Kate Holmes (flute) and Chris Taplin (clarinet, programming). Original names for the band included both Clouds and Plop!, but the band eventually settled on Frazier Chorus, a phrase they'd seen on a jacket for the Frazier College football team's cheerleaders in the United States.

The band first signed to British indie record label 4AD and released the single "Sloppy Heart" in 1987. Shortly afterwards, they moved to Virgin Records and achieved chart success with a string of melodic pop songs taken from their 1989 debut album, Sue. Allardyce was eventually dismissed from the band.

Their second album, Ray, followed in 1991, and its singles were remixed by a number of top remixers, including Paul Oakenfold, Chad Jackson and Youth. Following the album's release, the band was let go from Virgin after the label was purchased by EMI and began purging a number of its artists; subsequently, Holmes and Taplin fired Freeman before ultimately disbanding entirely. Holmes later moved into electronica via the bands Sirenes, Technique, and Client. 

Freeman took several years off and re-emerged in the mid-1990s, resurrecting the band name with permission from Holmes and Taplin. In 1995, Freeman released a mini-album as Frazier Chorus, Wide Awake, which did not reach the UK Albums Chart. He later released Monkey Spunk, a collection of five demos recorded prior to the sessions for Wide Awake, available exclusively via the band's website.

After leaving the band, Holmes became a member of the synthpop band Technique, before joining Dubstar's Sarah Blackwood in the electronic band CLIEͶT in the 2000s.

Discography

Studio albums

Singles

Compilations

References

External Links
 
 

4AD artists
Dream pop musical groups
English synth-pop groups
English new wave musical groups
Musical groups from Brighton and Hove
Musical groups established in 1986
Musical groups disestablished in 1996